Boğaziçi University, also known as Bosphorus University, is a major research university in Istanbul, Turkey. Its main campus is located on the European side of the Bosphorus strait. It has six faculties and two schools offering undergraduate degrees, and six institutes offering graduate degrees. Traditionally, the language of instruction is English.

Founded in 1863, as Robert College, it was the first American higher education institution founded outside the United States. Though under Turkish administration today, the university still maintains strong ties to the American educational system.

Boğaziçi University consistently ranks as Turkey's top university and has the greatest number of applicants via the Turkish university entrance examinations, making it the most selective state university in Turkey.

History 

In 1863, Robert College was founded in Bebek by Christopher Robert, a wealthy American philanthropist, and Cyrus Hamlin, a Congregational missionary devoted to education. Six years after its foundation,  the first campus (the current-day Boğaziçi South Campus) was built on the ridge near Rumeli Hisarı (the Rumelian Castle) with the permission of Sultan Abdulaziz.

According to a college catalogue compiled for the 1878–1879 academic year, "the object of the College is to give to its students, without distinction of race or religion, a thorough educational equal in all respects to that obtained at a first-class American college and based upon the same general principles."

After Cyrus Hamlin, the college was administrated by George Washburn (1877–1903) and Caleb Gates (1903–1932). The college, which was established as an institution of higher learning independent of the American Board of Commissioners for Foreign Missions (ABCFM) yet holding a significant number of missionaries among its faculty in its earlier years, adopted an entirely secular and non-denominational educational model in 1923 in compliance with the new republican principles of Turkey.

Before 1971, Robert College, had junior high school, high school, and university sections under the names Robert Academy, Robert College, and Robert College Yüksek (Yüksek" meaning "high" in Turkish). In 1971, the Bebek campus and academic staff of Robert College were turned over to the Republic of Turkey to be transformed into a public university named Boğaziçi University, the renamed continuation of Robert College's university section (i.e. Robert College Yüksek). The rest of Robert College moved into the Arnavutköy campus of the American College for Girls; despite continuing to call itself a college it  became merely a high school."

In the fall of 1971, Boğaziçi University started its first academic year with former faculty and students of Robert College Yüksek as well as a new cohort of freshman students. Aptullah Kuran, the former vice-president of Robert College Yüksek, was the founding rector of the university. Since then, the university has gradually transformed from a small liberal arts college into a major research university.

In early 2021, the university received a lot of media attention, after the Turkish government appointed a new rector, a post traditionally filled by democratic election. Students protested against the curtailment of academic freedom. More than 150 students were detained. The new rector dismissed the different faculty deans to then appoint himself dean of the university.

 Campus 
thumb|Boğaziçi University South Campus Washburn HallBoğaziçi University operates on six campuses in Istanbul. Four of these campuses (South Campus, North Campus, Hisar Campus, and Uçaksavar Campus) are within walking distance to each other on a hill above the affluent district of Bebek on the European side of Istanbul, overlooking the Bosphorus (hence the name).

The South Campus is considered to be the most popular Boğaziçi University Campus. It houses various historic buildings of Robert College, including Hamlin, Washburn, Theodorus, Dodge, Albert Long and Anderson Halls as well as the Kennedy Lodge, named after John F. Kennedy, and currently serving as a welcoming facility for visiting professors and staff.

The North Campus is home to Aptullah Kuran Library, which contains more than 740,000 printed books, 800,000 e-books, 55,000 e-journals as well as an extensive collection of Braille books, and a collection of rare books and manuscripts.

The Kandilli Campus is on the opposite side of the Bosphorus in Çengelköy, and hosts the historic Kandilli Observatory and Earthquake Research Institute (KOERI).

The newest campus is in Kilyos on the Black Sea coast, and is home to a private beach. The Kilyos Campus is the first self-sufficient university campus in the world, meeting all of its electricity demands from its own wind power plant. 

 Dormitories 

The university has ten dormitories on its different campuses. Boğaziçi's First Men's and Women's Dorms are housed in some of the oldest buildings in the historic South Campus and offer students the chance to participated in the university's active social life.

There are also four dormitories on Boğaziçi's North Campus. The First and Second North Campus Dormitories were opened in 198, the former for female students, the latter for males. They have similar 1980s modernist architectural designs. The Third North Campus Dorm was opened for female students in 2010. The Fourth Dormitory of the North Campus has been in service since 2011, and mainly accepts graduate students.
 
The Kilyos Campus Dormitories are approximately one hour's drive away from Boğaziçi South and North campuses. The First Kilyos Dormitory serves female students while the Second Kilyos Dormitory is for males.

The Superdorm and Kandilli Dorms also provide accommodation to Boğaziçi University students. The Kandilli Dormitory for female students opened in 2017 on the Kandilli Campus. The waste water collected from the bathrooms at the Kandilli Dorm is reused in the toilet reservoirs after treatment.

International rankings

Boğaziçi University ranks first in Turkey and 197th internationally according to U.S. News & World Report 2021 Best Global Universities Rankings, and shares the fifth rank among Turkish universities according to the Times Higher Education World University Rankings of 2021 (internationally: 601 – 800).

 Music and Sports Festivals 

Taşoda Music Festival is organized by Boğaziçi University Music Club every spring. It is the most important amateur music festival held in Turkey and takes its name from Music Club's studio at the South Campus.

Every May the Boğaziçi Sports Festival is held at the South Campus and other university venues. Usually, some 300 to 800 students from all over the world come to compete in various events.

 Departments offering bachelor's degrees Faculty of Arts and SciencesChemistry
History
Linguistics
Mathematics
Molecular Biology and Genetics
Philosophy
Physics
Psychology
Sociology
Translation and Interpreting Studies
Turkish Language and Literature
Western Languages and Literature (This department was formerly named English Language and Literature. In 2008, the content and courses were rearranged and the name was changed as well.)Faculty of Economics and Administrative SciencesEconomics
Management
Political Science and International RelationsFaculty of EducationComputer Education and Educational Technology
Foreign Language Education
Educational Sciences
Primary Education
Secondary School Science and Mathematics EducationFaculty of EngineeringChemical Engineering
Civil Engineering
Computer Engineering
Electrical and Electronic Engineering
Industrial Engineering
Mechanical EngineeringSchool of Applied DisciplinesManagement Information Systems
International Trade
Tourism AdministrationSchool of Foreign LanguagesAdvanced English
English Preparatory Division
Modern Languages Unit

 Institutes offering graduate programs Institute for Graduate Studies in Sciences and EngineeringAutomotive Engineering (M.S.)
Chemical Engineering (M.S., PhD)
Chemistry (M.S., PhD)
Civil Engineering (M.S., PhD)
Computational Science and Engineering (M.S.)
Computer Engineering (M.S., PhD)
Electrical and Electronic Engineering (M.S., PhD)
Engineering & Technology Management (M.S.)
Financial Engineering (M.S.)
Industrial Engineering (M.S., PhD)
Mathematics (M.S., PhD)
Mechanical Engineering (M.S., PhD)
Mechatronics (M.S.)
Medical Systems and Informatics (M.S.)
Molecular Biology and Genetics (M.S., PhD)
Nuclear Engineering (M.S., PhD)
Physics (M.S., PhD)
Secondary School Science Education and Mathematics Education (M.S., PhD)
Software Engineering (M.S.)
Systems and Control Engineering (M.S.)Atatürk Institute for Modern Turkish HistoryModern Turkish History (M.A., PhD)Institute of Biomedical EngineeringBiomedical Engineering (M.S., PhD)Institute of Environmental SciencesEnvironmental Sciences (M.S., PhD)
Environmental Technology (M.S., PhD)Kandilli Observatory and Earthquake Research InstituteEarthquake Engineering (M.S., PhD)
Earthquake Risk Reduction (M.S.)
Geodesy (M.S., PhD)
Geophysics (M.S., PhD)Institute for Graduate Studies in Social SciencesAsian Studies (M.A.)
Business Information Systems (M.A.)
Conference Interpreting (M.A.)
Cognitive Science (M.A.)
Critical and Cultural Studies (M.A.)
Economics (M.A., PhD)
Economics and security (M.A.)
Educational Sciences (M.A., Ph.D.)
English Language Education (M.A., Ph.D.)
English Literature (M.A., Ph.D.)
European Studies (M.A.)
Executive MBA
History (M.A., PhD)
International Trade (M.A.)
Linguistics (M.A., PhD)
Management (M.A., MBA, PhD)
Management Information Systems (M.A.)
Philosophy (M.A., Ph.D.)
Political Science and International Relations (M.A., PhD)
Psychology (M.A., PhD)
Sociology (M.A.)
Social Media Studies (M.A., Ph.D.)
Translation (M.A.)
Translation Studies (PhD)
Turkish Language and Literature (M.A., PhD)Vocational School of Hotel ManagementTourism Administration Program (Secondary education)Other Units Department of Fine Arts
 Department of Physical Education

 Independent centers 

Asian Studies Center
Boğaziçi University Center for European Studies
Boğaziçi University Center for Psychological Research and Services
Byzantine Studies Research Center
Center for Economics and EconometricsIstanbul Center for Mathematical Sciences (IMBM)'''
Mithat Alam Film Center
Nafi Baba Sufism, History, and Cultural Heritage Research Center
Nazım Hikmet Culture and Arts Research Center
Peace Education and Research Center
Polymer Research Center
Sustainable Development and Cleaner Production Center (SDCPC)

 Student clubs 

ADK (Atatürkist Thought Club )
Aviation Club
Ballet Club
Ballroom Dancing Society
Bridge Club
BISAK(Bogazici University Islamic Studies Club)
BUDS (Bogazici University Debating Society)
BUOK (Bogazici University Game Club)
BULGBTİ+ (LGBT Studies Club)
BUMATEK (Bogazici University Machinery and Technology Club)
BUSAS (Bogazici Under Water Sports Club)
BUSOS (Bogazici University Social Services)
BUSUIK (Bogazici University Politics and International Relations Club)
BUYAK (Bogazici University Operations Research Club)
BUHAK (Bogazici University Air Club) (Paragliding)
Chess Club
Cinema Club
IT Club (Compec)
Construction Club
Drama Club
Education and Research Club
Electro-Technology Club
Engineering Society
Environmental Society
GSK (Fine Arts Club)
BUFK (Folklore Club)
Green Crescent Club
BUED (Literature Club)
Mechanics and Technology Club
Management and Economics Club
Mountaineering Club
Music Club
Operations Research Club
Photography Club
Radio Club
Sailing Club
Riding Club
Science Club
Social Sciences Society
Speleology Club
Sports Committee
Translation Club
Turkish Classical Music Club
Village and Cooperatives Club
Women's Studies Club

 Notable alumni 

 Ezel Akay – Film Director
 Engin Ardıç – Writer, Journalist
 Nevzat Aydın – CEO and Founder of Yemeksepeti
 Gülse Birsel – Screenwriter, Actress, Journalist 
 Cem Boyner – CEO, Boyner Holding, Former Chairman of TUSIAD
 Cansu Canca– Bioethicist, Founder and Director of AI Ethics Lab 
 Nuri Bilge Ceylan – Film director, Winner of the Best Director Award at the Cannes Film Festival
 Tansu Çiller – Former Prime Minister of Turkey, Professor of Economics, Boğaziçi University
 Ahmet Davutoğlu – Former Prime Minister of Turkey, Former Minister of Foreign Affairs, Professor of International Relations
 Neşe Erberk – 1983 Miss Turkey, 1984 Miss Europe
 Erden Eruç – First solo human-powered circumnavigation and ocean rowing world record holder
 Fahriye Evcen – Actress
 Emre Gönensay – Former Minister of Foreign Affairs of Turkey, Professor of Economics, Boğaziçi University
 Faruk Gul – Professor of Economics, Princeton University
 Aydemir Güler – Leader of the Communist Party of Turkey (TKP)
 Murat Gülsoy – Writer
 Nil Karaibrahimgil – Singer and Composer
 Perihan Mağden – Writer, Journalist
 Fatma Ceren Necipoğlu – Harpist
 Hişyar Özsoy – Politician
 Güler Sabancı – CEO, Sabancı Holding
 Ozge Samanci – Artist, Professor, Northwestern University
 Defne Samyeli – News reporter, Anchorwoman, Actress
 Mete Sozen – Professor of Structural Engineering, Purdue University
 Barış Tan - Professor of Operations Management and Industrial Engineering at Koç University
 Harun Tekin – Rock musician, Frontman of Mor ve Ötesi
 Teoman – Singer and Composer
 Murat Ülker – Chairman of Yıldız Holding and Ülker
 Ahmet Yalçınkaya – Poet
 Ahmet Yildiz – Professor of Biophysics, University of California, Berkeley
 Cem Yılmaz – Comedian, Actor, Cartoonist
 Derviş Zaim – Film Director, Writer
 Pelin Batu – Actress, Writer

 Notable faculty 

 Ayşe Buğra – Professor of Political Economy
 Şevket Pamuk – Professor of Economic History, former president of European Historical Economics Society
 Şerif Mardin – Professor of Sociology and Political Science
 Kemal Kirişci – Professor of International Relations, Director of European Studies Center
 John Freely – Professor of Physics, Author
 Selim Deringil – Professor of History
 Nevra Necipoğlu – Professor of History
 Cahit Arf (1910–1997) Mathematician
 Cem Yıldırım – Professor of Mathematics
 Betül Tanbay – Professor of Mathematics
 Attila Aşkar – Professor of Mathematics, Rector of Koç University between 2001 and 2009
 Erdal İnönü – Former Deputy Prime Minister of Turkey, Former Dean, Professor Emeritus of Physics, Sabancı University, recipient of the Wigner Medal 2004
 Tansu Çiller – Former Prime Minister of Turkey, Professor of Economics
 Lale Akarun – Professor of Computer Engineering
 Ersin Kalaycıoğlu – Professor of Political Science, Rector of Işık University since 2004
 Karl von Terzaghi – Civil engineer, known as the Father of Soil Mechanics
 Heath Lowry – Professor of History, Princeton University
 Aptullah Kuran – Professor of Art History, Student Dean, Formerly of Robert College, First Rector of Boğaziçi University (deceased)
 Engin Arık – Professor of Physics (deceased)

 Rectors 

 Cyrus Hamlin (1863–1877)
 George Washburn (1878–1903)
 Caleb F. Gates (1903–1932)
 Paul Monroe (1932–1935)
 Walter L. Wright Jr (1935–1943)
 Floyd H. Black (1944–1955)
 Duncans Balantine (1955–1961)
 Patrick Murphy Malin (1962–1965)
 Dwight James Simpson (1965–1967)
 John Scott Everton (1968–1971)
 Aptullah Kuran (1971–1979)
 Semih Tezcan (1979–1982)
 Ergün Toğrol (1982–1992)
 Üstün Ergüder (1992–2000)
 Sabih Tansal (2000–2004)
 Ayşe Soysal (2004–2008)
 Kadri Özçaldıran (2008–2012)
 Gülay Barbarosoğlu (2012–2016)
 (appointed) Mehmed Özkan (2016–2021)
 (appointed) Melih Bulu (2021)
 (appointed) Naci Inci (2022)

See also
Robert College
List of universities in Turkey
List of universities in Istanbul
Boğaziçi Üniversitesi (Istanbul Metro)

References

Further reading
Ata, Ranan. 2006. Boğaziçi Üniversitesi'nde Sonbahar. Istanbul: Boğaziçi Üniversitesi Yayınları.
Çıracıoğlu, Vecdi and Mustafa Baykan. 2013. Bilim Yolunda 100 Yıl: Boğaziçi Üniversitesi Mühendislik Fakültesi. Istanbul: Boğaziçi Üniversitesi Yayınları.
Freely, John. 2012. A Bridge of Culture: Robert College-Bogazici University: How An American College in Istanbul Became A Turkish University. Istanbul: Boğaziçi Üniversitesi Yayınları.
Freely, John. 2009. A History of Robert College. Istanbul: YKY.
Hamlin Cyrus, 2014. Among The Turks – My Life and Times. Istanbul: Boğaziçi Üniversitesi Yayınları (Originally published separately by Robert Carter & Brothers, New York, 1878; and Congregational School and Publishing Society, Boston and Chicago, 1893).
Kuran, Aptullah, 2013, Bir Kurucu Rektörün Anıları: Robert Kolej Yüksekokulu'ndan Boğaziçi Üniversitesi'ne. Istanbul: Boğaziçi Üniversitesi Yayınları.
Washburn, George. 2012.  Fifty Years in Constantinople and Recollections of Robert College.'' Istanbul: Boğaziçi Üniversitesi Yayınları (Originally published by Houghton Mufflin Company, Boston and New York, 1909).

External links

 Boğaziçi University home page
 Boğaziçi University main page

 
1863 establishments in the Ottoman Empire
1971 establishments in Turkey
Educational institutions established in 1971
Bosphorus
Istanbul Central Business District